Julie Parkes (born 17 April 1965) is an Irish swimmer. She competed in two events at the 1984 Summer Olympics.

References

External links
 

1965 births
Living people
Irish female swimmers
Olympic swimmers of Ireland
Swimmers at the 1984 Summer Olympics
Place of birth missing (living people)